The 1908 Rhode Island gubernatorial election was held on November 3, 1908. Republican nominee Aram J. Pothier defeated Democratic nominee Olney Arnold with 52.61% of the vote.

General election

Candidates
Major party candidates
Aram J. Pothier, Republican
Olney Arnold, Democratic

Other candidates
William H. Johnston, Socialist
Louis E. Remington, Prohibition
A.E. Mowry, Independent
Thomas F. Herrick, Socialist Labor

Results

References

1908
Rhode Island
Gubernatorial